Ouro Branco is a Portuguese phrase meaning "white gold". It may refer to the following places in Brazil:

 Ouro Branco, Alagoas
 Ouro Branco, Minas Gerais
 Ouro Branco, Rio Grande do Norte